Live! Blueswailing July '64 is a live album by English rock group the Yardbirds. The recordings were discovered in 2003 and when the album was released that year, the date and location of the performance was uncertain.  However, it since has been determined that it was recorded at the Marquee Club in London on 7 August 1964. As with the group's British debut album (recorded at the Marquee in March) it contains some of the earliest live recordings with guitarist Eric Clapton.

Recording
After the song "Got Love If You Want It", it is announced that Eric Clapton's guitar needs to be tuned, and in the meantime, Keith Relf tells the story of how at an earlier gig, Chris Dreja's Gibson guitar was broken in two by a falling speaker cabinet.  He also claims that Clapton's guitar is the only black Fender Jazzmaster in the world.  Dreja adds:

Critical reception

AllMusic reviewer Thom Jurek gave the album three out of five stars.  He believes that the Yardbirds' performance and the sound quality of the recording is superior to the group's first live album, Five Live Yardbirds (1964).  He notes:

Track listing
Songwriters and track running times are taken from the original Castle/Sanctuary CD.  Other releases may have different listings.

Personnel
The Yardbirds
Keith Relfharmonica, vocals
Jim McCartydrums
Eric Claptonguitar
Chris Drejarhythm guitar
Paul Samwell-Smithbass
Technical
Roger Dopsoncoordination
Neil Slavenliner notes, annotation
Norman Joplingquotes researched and compiled
Nick Watsonaudio restoration, digital mastering
Sam Szczepanskiproduct manager
Paul Bevoirartwork, design
Hamish Grimesphotography

Footnotes

References

Bibliography

External links

The Yardbirds live albums
2003 live albums
Albums produced by Giorgio Gomelsky
Castle Communications live albums